Tyler Scott Drumheller (April 12, 1952 – August 2, 2015) was an American Central Intelligence Agency (CIA) officer who served as chief of the European division for clandestine operations in the Directorate of Operations from 2001 until he retired in 2005.

Early life
Drumheller was born in Biloxi, Mississippi.

Career
Drumheller claimed the CIA had credible sources discounting some weapon of mass destruction (WMD) claims made during the Iraq disarmament crisis before the 2003 Invasion of Iraq. He received and discounted documents central to the Niger yellowcake forgery prior to the 2003 invasion of Iraq. He has also stated that senior White House officials dismissed intelligence information from his agency which reported Saddam Hussein had no WMD program.

According to Drumheller the Bush administration ignored CIA advice and used whatever information it could find to justify an invasion of Iraq. The CIA, brokered by the French intelligence service, recruited Iraqi Foreign Minister Naji Sabri in Europe during the late summer of 2002. Sabri told the CIA in September that Hussein had no major active weapons of mass destruction programs, had no fissile material and that biological weapons were almost non-existent, although he claimed that there were chemical weapons. This information was then transmitted to the White House, but it was ignored in favor of the information acquired by Germany's intelligence service Bundesnachrichtendienst (BND) coming from a source known as Curveball.

On September 6, 2007, Sidney Blumenthal, reporting at Salon.com, supported Drumheller's account: "Now two former senior CIA officers have confirmed Drumheller's account to me and provided the background to the story of how the information that might have stopped the invasion of Iraq was twisted in order to justify it." In March 2011, Blumenthal sent an email which included "apparently highly sensitive information" to then U.S. Secretary of State Hillary Clinton with details received from Drumheller, who had spoken with a CIA colleague, mentioning the name of an intelligence source.

Drumheller retired from the CIA in 2005 after a 26-year career, where he spent more than 25 years as an intelligence operative.

Death

Drumheller died on August 2, 2015, from pancreatic cancer at the age of 63 in Falls Church, Virginia. He is buried at Columbia Gardens Cemetery in Arlington, Virginia.

See also
William D. Murray

References

Bibliography
 On the Brink : An Insider's Account of How the White House Compromised American Intelligence (Carroll & Graf, November 2006); 
 Wie das Weiße Haus die Welt belügt: Der Insider-Bericht des ehemaligen CIA-Chefs von Europa (Hugendubel Verlag, August 2007);

External links
 Interview with 60 Minutes
 Video of CBS interview
 Interview with MSNBC Hardball
 Select Committee on Intelligence Report
 Mystery flights (TV program includes interview with Drumheller)
A Dispatches report on Extraordinary Rendition, broadcast on Channel 4, June 11, 2007 (Also includes an interview with Tyler Drumheller)
 Panorama (TV program includes interview with Drumheller)

1952 births
2015 deaths
American anti–Iraq War activists
American spies
Deaths from cancer in Virginia
Deaths from pancreatic cancer
People from Biloxi, Mississippi
People of the Central Intelligence Agency